Screwed may refer to:

 Fastened with a screw
 Slang for having pressure or stress exerted as if having a screw driven in
 Slang for fornication
 Slang for in serious trouble

Film and TV
 Screwed (2000 film), a comedy starring Norm Macdonald, Dave Chappelle and Danny DeVito
 Screwed (2011 film), a British drama directed by Reg Traviss
 Screwed (Pihalla), a Finnish drama directed by Nils-Erik Ekblom
 Screwed, a 2011 film featuring Shane Warren Jones
 Screwed: The Truth About Life as a Prison Officer, a 2008 book by Ronnie Thompson, basis for the 2011 British film

Music
 Screwed (music) or chopped and screwed, a technique of remixing hip hop music
 "Screwed", a 2006 song by Paris Hilton from Paris
 "Screwed", a 2015 song by Kid Cudi from Speedin' Bullet 2 Heaven
 "Screwed", a 2018 song by Janelle Monáe from Dirty Computer